The Seventh Son (German: Der siebente Junge) is a 1926 German silent drama film directed by Franz Osten and starring Maria Mindzenty, Ferdinand Martini and Carl Walther Meyer. It premiered in Berlin on 23 March 1926.

It was shot at the Bavaria Studios in Munich.

Cast
Maria Mindzenty as Konstantine 
Ferdinand Martini as Wendelin Nimmersatt 
Carl Walther Meyer as Prince Arthur 
Elise Aulinger as Klothilde Nimmersatt 
Martin Lindemann as Fürst Clemens VIII
Hilde Horst as Evchen Bergner 
Hermann Pfanz as Eusebius Riemenschneider
Frau Heuberger-Schönemann as Ludmila 
John W. Lantz as Alter 
Manfred Koempel-Pilot

References

External links

1926 drama films
Films of the Weimar Republic
German silent feature films
German drama films
Films directed by Franz Osten
German black-and-white films
Bavaria Film films
Films shot at Bavaria Studios
Silent drama films
1920s German films
1920s German-language films